Benjamin Baker Moeur (December 22, 1869 – March 16, 1937) was an American physician who served as the fourth governor of Arizona.

Biography
Born in Decherd, Tennessee, Moeur attended medical school in Little Rock, Arkansas. After graduating in 1896, Moeur moved to Tempe, Arizona and started a medical practice.  He was a representative for Maricopa County at the State of Arizona Constitution Convention in 1910. He also served on the Tempe School Board and served as the Secretary of the Board of Education for Arizona State Teacher's College (the precursor to Arizona State University) in Tempe.

During Moeur's governorship, he mobilized the Arizona National Guard to stop the construction on Parker Dam, which was being built primarily to divert more water to the Los Angeles area. The mobilization was partly an embarrassment, as the troops arrived via an antiquated steamboat, which became stranded. Its troops were rescued by workers from California working at the dam. Moeur's primary motive, however, was later vindicated by the United States Supreme Court when it ruled that California and the Bureau of Reclamation were constructing Parker Dam illegally because the dam had never been properly authorized. Subsequent legislation rectified this error and construction continued apace.

Governor Moeur served two terms  (1933–1937) and died 71 days after he left office. He died in Tempe, where he is buried at the Double Butte Cemetery.

Personal life
Moeur married Honor G. Anderson in 1896. His wife was the sister of  Guess Eleanor Birchett  (1881–1979) who was known as "the Bird Lady of Tempe".

Legacy
In 1939, as a WPA project, Tempe Normal School (later known as Arizona State University) constructed the B. B. Moeur Activity Building on the main Tempe campus. The building was originally the women's activity center, later being remodeled and used as the university's admissions office. The building now houses the Mars Space Flight Facility, a NASA-funded research center directed by Dr. Phil Christensen.

Dr. Moeur has been honored since 1901 by the now Arizona State University via the Moeur Award. The Moeur Award is given to the student or students with the highest academic standing in terms of GPA, and is thus also considered the equivalent to a Valedictorian Award (which is not directly offered by Arizona State).

Gallery

References

External links
 Biography at the Tempe Historical Society
 Description of Moeur Building at Arizona State University
 Information on Moeur's historic home, listed on the Tempe Historic Property register

Democratic Party governors of Arizona
1869 births
1937 deaths
People from Franklin County, Tennessee
Politicians from Tempe, Arizona
Physicians from Arizona
School board members in Arizona
Arizona State University alumni